Ghubar-e-Khatir ("The Dust of Memories"), (Urdu: غبار خاطر) is one of the most important works of Maulana Abul Kalam Azad, written primarily during 1942 to 1946 when he was imprisoned in Ahmednagar Fort in Maharashtra by the British Raj while he was in Bombay (now Mumbai) to preside over the meeting of All India Congress Working Committee. It was translated as Sallies of Mind in English.

The book is a collection of 24 letters he wrote addressing his close friend Maulana Habibur Rahman Khan Sherwani. These letters were never sent because there was no permission for that during Azad's imprisonment and after his release in 1946, he gave all these letters to his 
Secretary Muhammad Ajmal Khan who published them for the first time in 1946.

Contents
Although the book is a collection of letters, all but one or two letters are unique and most of the letters deal with complex issues such as existence of God, the origin of religions, the origin of music and its place in religion, and other topics.

The book is primarily in Urdu but there are over five hundred couplets, mostly in Persian and Arabic. This is because Azad was born in a family where Arabic and Persian were used more frequently than Urdu. He was born in Mecca, given formal education in Persian and Arabic languages but was never taught Urdu.

Notes

Indian non-fiction books
1946 non-fiction books
20th-century Indian books